The French Athletics Championships is an annual outdoor track and field competition organised by the Fédération française d'athlétisme (FFA; French Athletics Federation), which serves as the French national championships for the sport. The three-day event is typically held in early or mid-summer and the venue varies on an annual basis. It is open to adults of all ages and is thus referred to as the senior or élite championships.

The championships were first held in 1888 and were organised by the Union des Sociétés Françaises de Sports Athlétiques (USFSA; Union of French Athletics Sports Societies). The USFSA declined in favour of specialised national sports bodies early in the 20th century and FFA has organised the championships since 1921. The championships have been held every year since their inauguration with the exception of four inter-war years: 1915, 1916, 1940, and 1944.

Events
On the current programme a total of 38 individual French Championship athletics events are contested, divided evenly between men and women. For each of the sexes, there are six track running events, three obstacle events, four jumps, four throws, a racewalk and a combined track and field event.

Track running
100 metres, 200 metres, 400 metres, 800 metres, 1500 metres, 5000 metres
Obstacle events
100 metres hurdles (women only), 110 metres hurdles (men only), 400 metres hurdles, 3000 metres steeplechase
Jumping events
Pole vault, high jump, long jump, triple jump
Throwing events
Shot put, discus throw, javelin throw, hammer throw
Walking events
5000 metres race walk
Combined events
Decathlon (men only), heptathlon (women only)

In addition to the individual championship events, clubs are entered into team championship events which include relays over four distances:
4 × 100 metres relay, 4 × 200 metres relay, 4 × 400 metres relay and 4 × 1500 metres relay.

Until 1995, the long-distance women's event was over 3000 metres. This was matched to the men's distance of 5000 m in line with changes in the Olympic programme. Though fewer events were initially on offer in the women's track and field programme for the French championships, this was gradually expanded, with the 1500 m being introduced in 1969, the 3000 m in 1972, the 400 m hurdles in 1976, the triple jump in 1990, the hammer throw in 1994, and the pole vault in 1995. The introduction of a women's 3000 m steeplechase in 2000 finally brought the men's and women's programmes to parity.

Separate championship events are held for the 10,000 metres, road running and walks, and cross country running.

Editions

Championships records

Men

Women

References

External links

Official website

 
Athletics competitions in France
Athletics
National athletics competitions
Recurring sporting events established in 1888
1888 establishments in France